Isomeria is a genus of air-breathing land snails, terrestrial pulmonate gastropod mollusks in the family Labyrinthidae.

Species
Species within the genus Isomeria include:
 Isomeria aequatoria (L. Pfeiffer, 1860)
 Isomeria aequatoriana (Hidalgo, 1867)
 Isomeria aloagana Jouseaume, 1887
 Isomeria anadonta Pilsbry, 1949
 Isomeria basidens (Mousson, 1873)
 Isomeria bituberculata (Reeve, 1852)
 Isomeria bourcieri (Reeve, 1852)
 Isomeria continua (Reeve, 1854)
 Isomeria cymatodes (L. Pfeiffer, 1852)
 Isomeria equestrata (J. Moricand, 1858)
 Isomeria fordiana (Pilsbry, 1889)
 Isomeria gealei (E.A. Smith, 1877)
 Isomeria globosa (Broderip, 1832)
 Isomeria goettingi F. J. Borrero, 2012
 Isomeria hartwegi (L. Pfeiffer, 1846)
 Isomeria inexpectata Solem, 1966
 Isomeria jacksoni Solem, 1966
 Isomeria juno (L. Pfeiffer, 1850)
 Isomeria kolbergi Miller, 1878
 Isomeria medemi Solem, 1966
 Isomeria meobambensis (L. Pfeiffer, 1857)
 Isomeria meyeri (Kobelt, 1894)
 Isomeria minuta Solem, 1966
 Isomeria morula (Hidalgo, 1870)
 Isomeria neogranadensis (L. Pfeiffer, 1845)
 Isomeria oreas (Koch, 1844)
 Isomeria scalena (Martens, 1881)
 Isomeria stoltzmanni (Lubomirski, 1879)
 Isomeria subelliptica (Mousson, 1869)
 Isomeria triodonta (d'Orbigny, 1835)
Species brought into synonymy
 Isomeria anestia Pilsbry, 1949: synonym of Isomeria meobambensis (L. Pfeiffer, 1857) (junior synonym)
 Isomeria bifurcata (Deshayes, 1838): synonym of Labyrinthus bifurcatus (Deshayes, 1838) (superseded combination)
 Isomeria bituberculata (L. Pfeiffer, 1853) : synonym of Isomeria bourcieri (Reeve, 1852) (based on an unavailable original name)
 Isomeria bourcieri (L. Pfeiffer, 1853) : synonym of Isomeria bituberculata (Reeve, 1852) (combination based on an unavailable original name)
 Isomeria granulatissima Miller, 1878 : synonym of Isomeria kolbergi Miller, 1878 (junior synonym)
 Isomeria parietidentata Miller, 1878 : synonym of Isomeria cymatodes (L. Pfeiffer, 1852) (junior synonym)
 Isomeria subcastanea (L. Pfeiffer, 1842) : synonym of Isomeria globosa (Broderip, 1832) (junior synonym)

References

External links 

 Albers, J. C. (1850). Die Heliceen nach natürlicher Verwandtschaft systematisch geordnet. Berlin: Enslin. 262 pp
 Solem, A. (1966). Neotropical Land Snail Genera Labyrinthus and Isomeria (Pulmonata, Camaenidae). Fieldiana: Zoology. 50: 1-226
 Sei M., Robinson D.G., Geneva A.J. & Rosenberg G. (2017). Doubled helix: Sagdoidea is the overlooked sister group of Helicoidea (Mollusca: Gastropoda: Pulmonata). Biological Journal of the Linnean Society. 122(4): 697-728
 Breure, A. S. H. & Araujo, R. (2017). The Neotropical land snails (Mollusca, Gastropoda) collected by the “Comisión Científica del Pacífico.”. PeerJ. 5, e3065

Labyrinthidae
Gastropod genera